is a junction railway station in the town of Shōnai, Yamagata, Japan, operated by the East Japan Railway Company (JR East).

Lines
Amarume Station is served by the Rikuu West Line and the Uetsu Main Line. The station is located 154.7 rail kilometers from the starting point of the Uetsu Main Line at Niitsu Station, and is the official terminus of the 42.0 kilometer Rikuu West Line, although most trains continue on to Sakata Station.

Station layout
Amarume Station has one side platform next to the station building and two island platforms connected by a footbridge. However, as Platform 1 is short, it is not in normal operation. The station has a Midori no Madoguchi staffed ticket office.

Platforms

History
Amarume Station opened on 20 September 1914. A new station building was opened in 1965. With the privatization of JNR on 1 April 1987, the station came under the control of JR East.

Passenger statistics
In fiscal 2018, the station was used by an average of 503 passengers daily (boarding passengers only). The passenger figures for previous years are as shown below.

Surrounding area
 Shōnai Town Hall
 Amarume Post Office

See also
List of railway stations in Japan

References

External links

 Amarume Station information (JR East) 

Stations of East Japan Railway Company
Railway stations in Yamagata Prefecture
Rikuu West Line
Uetsu Main Line
Railway stations in Japan opened in 1914
Shōnai, Yamagata